Telsen is a village in Chubut Province, Argentina. It is the head town of the Telsen Department located 241 km west of the provincial capital Rawson. It was founded on December 9, 1898 by John Marley.

External links

Populated places in Chubut Province
Populated places established in 1898
1898 establishments in Argentina